De Martini is an Italian surname. Notable people with the surname include:

Angelo De Martini (1897–1979), Italian cyclist
Francesco De Martini, Italian Military Information Service captain
 Isabella 'Susy' De Martini (born 1952), an Italian politician and Member of the European Parliament

Italian-language surnames
Surnames from given names